Jan Arend Godert de Vos van Steenwijk may refer to:
 Jan Arend Godert de Vos van Steenwijk I, King's Commissioner for the Dutch province of Drenthe
 Jan Arend Godert de Vos van Steenwijk II, president of the senate of the Netherlands
 Jan Arend Godert de Vos van Steenwijk III, chairman of the Dutch High Council of Nobility